Daniel Huber (born 2 January 1993) is an Austrian ski jumper.

Huber's debut in FIS Ski Jumping World Cup took place in Sapporo in 2016.

World Cup

Individual victories

References

External links

1993 births
Living people
Sportspeople from Salzburg
Austrian male ski jumpers
FIS Nordic World Ski Championships medalists in ski jumping
Universiade bronze medalists for Austria
Universiade medalists in ski jumping
Competitors at the 2013 Winter Universiade
Ski jumpers at the 2022 Winter Olympics
Olympic ski jumpers of Austria
Medalists at the 2022 Winter Olympics
Olympic gold medalists for Austria
Olympic medalists in ski jumping
21st-century Austrian people